Jillian Ann Loyden (born June 25, 1985) is an American retired soccer goalkeeper who most recently played for Sky Blue FC in the National Women's Soccer League and the United States women's soccer team. She previously played for the Saint Louis Athletica, Chicago Red Stars, and MagicJack in the WPS. She became an assistant coach for Sky Blue FC in 2016.

Early life
A native of Vineland, New Jersey, Loyden played soccer and basketball at Vineland High School. She was named a first team All-State selection and was chosen as the Player of the Year by The Press of Atlantic City and The Daily Journal. She was also named the Daily Journal Player of the Year in 2001 and was a three-time All-South Jersey and All-Cape Atlantic League performer.

Playing career

Collegiate career
Loyden attended Villanova University and majored in comprehensive science. She played goalkeeper for the Wildcats. During her senior year, she had a .891 save percentage (fourth in the United States), finished with a 0.52 goals-against average (10th in nation), and was named Big East Goalkeeper of the Year for the third straight season (a conference first) and named First-Team All-Big East. During her junior year, she was named NSCAA First-Team All-American First-Team All-Big East and was honored as the Big East Goalkeeper of the Year.

Club career

In 2009, Loyden was drafted in the sixth round (37th overall) of the inaugural season of the Women's Professional Soccer. She was the back-up goalkeeper for Hope Solo on St. Louis Athletica. During her first appearance for St. Louis on May 23 in Chicago, she made six saves in a 2–0 win and was named WPS Player of the Week.

In 2010, Loyden was the starting goalkeeper for the Chicago Red Stars in the Women's Professional Soccer league, playing in 23 games while making 72 saves and compiling a 1.17 GAA.

In 2011, Loyden served as the goalkeeper for magicJack in the Women's Professional Soccer league. She started and played in eight regular season games helping the team to the WPS playoffs.

On January 11, 2013, she joined Sky Blue FC in the new National Women's Soccer League.

International career

Loyden made her first appearance for the  United States women's national soccer team on October 2, 2010, in a game against China. In 2011, she earned a spot on her first world championship roster, making the Women's World Cup team as the third goalkeeper.

She was an alternate on the 2012 London Olympics roster, along with Christen Press, Lori Lindsey, and Meghan Klingenberg. After winning the gold medal, the team embarked on a "Victory Tour," during which Loyden was substituted in for Hope Solo in the 55th minute of the game against Costa Rica.

Loyden decided to retire from international soccer in October 2014, citing a need to focus on raising her nephew, whose mother (Loyden's younger sister Britton) was murdered by her fiancée in 2012.

Coaching career

On February 4, 2016, Loyden was named an assistant coach for Sky Blue FC, where she had previously played in 2013–2014.

References

External links

 Jill Loyden interview at KeeperPortal.co.uk
 Jillian Loyden profile at National Women's Soccer League
 Jillian Loyden  profile at Sky Blue FC
 
 US Soccer player profile
 Saint Louis Athletica player profile 
 Villanova player profile
 FIFA World Cup 2015 player profile
 

1985 births
Living people
Villanova Wildcats women's soccer players
American women's soccer players
American expatriate sportspeople in Australia
Saint Louis Athletica players
Chicago Red Stars players
Expatriate women's soccer players in Australia
2011 FIFA Women's World Cup players
MagicJack (WPS) players
People from Vineland, New Jersey
NJ/NY Gotham FC players
United States women's international soccer players
Women's Professional Soccer players
Women's association football goalkeepers
National Women's Soccer League players
Vineland High School alumni